The Faction independent of Ahdut HaAvoda (Sia Bilti Talouya BeAhdut HaAvoda) was a short-lived political party in Israel.

History
The Faction independent of Ahdut HaAvoda was formed on 20 January 1953 (during the second Knesset) as a breakaway from Mapam in the aftermath of the Prague Trials. The show trials in which mostly Jewish leaders of the Communist Party of Czechoslovakia were purged, falsely implicated Mapam's envoy in Prague, Mordechai Oren, as part of a Zionist conspiracy. This, and later Nikita Khrushchev's  Secret Speech at the 20th Party Congress in the Soviet Union, led to Mapam moving away from some of their more radical left wing positions, and towards social democracy.

Unhappy with the move, several Mapam MKs left the party; Rostam Bastuni, Avraham Berman and Moshe Sneh established the Left Faction and Moshe Aram, Yisrael Bar-Yehuda, Yitzhak Ben-Aharon and Aharon Zisling set up Ahdut HaAvoda – Poale Zion, recreating the old party that had merged into Mapam. However, Hannah Lamdan and David Livschitz did not wish to join the new Ahdut HaAvoda party, so created the Faction independent of Ahdut HaAvoda.

The faction ceased to exist on 13 January 1954 when Lamdan and Livschitz both joined Mapai.

External links
Faction Independent from Ahdut Ha'avoda Knesset website

Political parties established in 1953
Defunct political parties in Israel
Labor Zionism
Zionist political parties in Israel
Political parties disestablished in 1954
1953 establishments in Israel
1954 disestablishments in Israel